The Ministry of Foreign Affairs of the Republic of Lithuania is a governmental body of the Republic of Lithuania that shapes the national policy, and organises, coordinates, and controls its enforcement in the following areas: foreign affairs and security policy: international relations, economic security, foreign trade, protection of the rights and interests of the Republic of Lithuania and its persons and entities abroad; coordination of European Union membership; representing the Republic of Lithuania abroad diplomatic and consular relations, diplomatic service, Lithuanian national and diplomatic protocol, international relations; the policy of cooperation of the Republic of Lithuania; strengthening of expat connections with Lithuania. The Ministry of Foreign Affairs was established on 4 November 1918, shortly after Lithuania reestablished its independence.

Activity

The head of the Ministry is the foreign minister. The current head of the Ministry is Gabrielius Landsbergis. He is appointed and revoked by the President of the Republic of Lithuania by motion from the Prime Minister. The foreign minister is subordinate to the Parliament, the President, and the Prime Minister of the Republic of Lithuania. The foreign minister supervises the Ministry, deals with matters that lay within its sphere of competence, signs international agreements, ensures the enforcement of regulations the Ministry is tasked to oversee, files bills, ensures the execution of orders from the Government and the Prime Minister of the Republic of Lithuania, approves Strategic Planning Methodology, issues annual reports, coordinates and controls the work of administrational departments of the Ministry, as well as the activities of diplomatic missions, consular establishments and offices of the Republic of Lithuania to international organizations, file motions to the President of the Republic of Lithuania to award the diplomatic ranks of ambassador extraordinary and plenipotentiary of the Republic of Lithuania, envoy extraordinary of the Republic of Lithuania, and minister plenipotentiary of the Republic of Lithuania, and to the Government of the Republic of Lithuania, to appoint or recall diplomatic representatives (ambassadors extraordinary and plenipotentiary), defines the areas of activity for vice-ministers, and areas of cooperation for the Ministry chancellor.

In his work, the minister is advised by officers of political trust – vice-ministers. The Ministry may not have more than four of them. They organise and control execution of orders, the drafting and approval of draft regulations, and represent the minister by assignment, presenting the minister's political attitudes and decisions to the public.

The analysis, planning, formation, coordination, and enforcement of Lithuania's foreign policy is done by the political director of the Foreign Ministry. The director's functions include high-level representation of Lithuania abroad. The political director is involved in the activities of the Ministry's management, cooperates with the Ministry's administrative departments, domestic and foreign institutions, bodies, and individual partners. The director also supervises the formation, enforcement, and development of the security policy and cooperation with foreign countries, regions, and international organizations, the strengthening of the Eastern neighborhood policy, human rights and democracy, European policy, trans-Atlantic and developmental cooperation, and support of democracy.

The head of the Ministry's administration is the chancellor. The chancellor coordinates and controls the activities of the Ministry's administrative departments, ensures that financial and intellectual resources, assets and information are used optimally to achieve the Ministry's strategic operating goals and objectives.

The foreign minister has an advisory institution, the so-called board.

Ministers

References

Sources
 Lietuvos Respublikos Užsienio reikalų ministrai 1918-1940. Retrieved on 2008-08-10
 Lietuvos Respublikos Užsienio reikalų ministrai 1990 - 2006. Retrieved on 2008-08-10

External links
 Ministry of Foreign Affairs of Republic of Lithuania
 Diplomatinis Kaunas

 
Lithuania
Lithuania, Foreign Affairs
Foreign Affairs